The 1915 Kingston by-election was held on 16 November 1915.  The by-election was held due to the incumbent Conservative MP, George Cave, becoming Solicitor General for England and Wales.  It was retained by Cave.

References

Kingston by-election
Kingston by-election
Kingston.1915
Kingston.1915
Politics of the Royal Borough of Kingston upon Thames
20th century in Surrey
Unopposed by-elections to the Parliament of the United Kingdom (need citation)
Kingston by-election